Paris Plage or Paris-Plage may refer to:

 Paris-Plages, a program of temporary beaches in Paris each summer, originally called "Paris-Plage"
 Le Touquet-Paris-Plage, beach resort on the north coast of France